Georgatou is a Greek surname. Notable people with the surname include:

Diamantina Georgatou (born 1986), Greek Olympic diver
Maria Georgatou (born 1984), Greek Olympic rhythmic gymnast
Eirini Georgatou (born 1990), Greek tennis player

Greek-language surnames
Surnames